William Fletcher Russell (May 18, 1890 - March 26, 1956) was an American educator, and dean (1927-1949) and president (1949-1954) of Teachers College, Columbia University, New York City.

Russell was born in Delhi, New York. The son of James Earl Russell. He graduated from Cornell University in 1910, and earned a PhD at Columbia University in 1914.

From 1917 to 1923, he was dean of the College of Education, State University of Iowa.

In 1923, he visited Bulgaria to study aspects of the local educational system.

In 1927 he became dean of Teachers College, a position which his father once held. He became president of Teachers College in 1949, retired in 1954, then served as deputy director for Technical Services of the International Cooperation Administration.

Russell died 1956 in Washington D.C. of a heart attack.

Works 
 How to Judge a School
 Economy in Secondary Education (1916)
 Education in the United States (1917)
 Schools in Bulgaria (1924)
 The Meaning of Democracy (with T. H. Briggs, 1941)
 The Rise of a University (as editor) (Vol. I, 1937)
 "Liberty vs. Equality" (1936)

External links 
 
 Picture of Russell at Teachers College Archive
 In memoriam

1890 births
1956 deaths
People from Delhi, New York
Education school deans
Teachers College, Columbia University faculty
Cornell University alumni
20th-century American academics